Cha Chung-hwa (born on 28 April 1980) is a South Korean character actress who has worked extensively on stage, screen, and television. She has been nominated for Baeksang Arts Awards for her role as court lady in tvN historical drama Mr. Queen.

After graduating from Department of Theatre of Sangmyung University, Cha made her debut onstage in 2005. Cha built up her acting skills by appearing in popular works in Daehak-ro such as "Lunatic," "Sheer Madness," and "Suspicious Heungsinso." She continued to work in various roles, including the plays "Late Night Restaurant," "Midnight Serenade," and "Heavy Metal Girls," showing her own charm to the audience as "Multi-role" or "Supporting Role."

She is known for her roles in Crash Landing on You (2019), Mr. Queen (2020-21), Hometown Cha-Cha-Cha (2021), and Dr. Park's Clinic (2022). She has acted in film As One (2012), Train to Busan (2016) and Pawn among many.

Early years and education
Cha Chung-hwa was born on 28 April 1980. Born and raised in Gwangmyeong, Gyeonggi-do, Cha was an model student during her school days. Cha served as class president throughout elementary, middle and high school and entered the best high school in Gwangmyeong, a non-standard area. Cha dreamed of becoming the president, but her dream kept changing.

When She was in high school, Cha felt happy while watching TV, movies, or listening to music. She became a fan of singer Park Jin-young, so she dreamed of becoming an 'all-around entertainer'. She faced opposition from her parents, who wanted her to study accounting for stable career in the future. Cha decided to follow for her dream. Despite her parent opposition, She applied to Department of Theatre of Sangmyung University.

Career

Debut 
In 2006, at the age of 25, she made her debut as musical actress in Daehak-ro as a multi-role in the musical Backstreet Story. After graduating from college, Cha tried many jobs including shopping mall buyer, interned at an advertising and public relations company, but realized that those jobs did not suited her, and since she was in her 30s, she was obsessed with theater. 

Starting with a minor role in the film Harmony starring Kim Yun-jin in 2010, Cha gradually built up his filmography by doing both films and musicals. In January 2011, through an audition with a high competition rate, new actors were selected to act in Korean encore performance of play Sheer Madness. Cha, who showed a unique acting skills and overwhelming energy in musical March of Youth, Runatic, was selected to acted Kwon Young-hwa.

In 2012, Cha acted another minor role in films As One (2012). It is about a late-night diner, open from midnight to dawn, and its eccentric patrons. It was already adapted into Japanese Drama Midnight Diner in 2009.She reprised her role in 2014.

Cha acted in 2014 revival of Musical 'Oh! While You Were Sleeping', director Jang Yoo-jeong and composer Kim Hye-seong, a recognized combination in the creative musical world.

In 2015, Cha acted as Park Jung-ja in musical Midnight Serenade.  Cha first knew about Midnight Serenade, while filming the 2009 movie Harmony. Since Cha she saw her senior actress, who was filming with her at the time, practicing guitar to audition, Cha always wanted to play the role. She then auditioned for the 2015 revival as per recommendation of her fellow actress. Also in 2015, Cha got her First supporting role in small screen with the MBC drama Shopping King Louie, and she gradually began to show off her presence.

In 2016, Cha acted as Jung-min, in the play 'Heavy Metal Girls'. Jung min is a researcher who dedicated her youth and couldn't get married, and made hit products such as tomato ramen and honey chicken breast. She dedicated her life for 16 years at work, but She was laid-off. Cha was praise for her sincerity.

Breakthrough 
In 2019 she costarred in tvN's TV series Crash Landing on You, starring Hyun Bin and Son Ye-jin. Her role was one of North Korean village lady, Yang Ok-geum, a former announcer and hairdresser. As former announcer, she is in charge of the announcements in the corporate housing complex. Her character really eye-catching with fancy makeup and costumes, and was strongly imprinted in the minds of viewers. She always hangs out with Na Wol-suk and adds fun to drama with a sisterhood momentum that exudes tiki-taka chemistry.

In 2020, Cha was cast as court lady Choi of Queen Chorin (played by Shin Hye-sun) in historical drama Mr. Queen. She got a hot response from viewers, dominating real-time search terms after the broadcast. She was also invited to many popular television shows. Cha also gained critical recognition for her role, with Baeksang Arts Awards nomination for best supporting actress.

After drama Mr. Queen, Cha was busy in 2021. Cha made special appearance in thriller drama Beyond Evil as Lee Geum-hwa, whose role is vital to the plot. Cha showed off her charisma as Professor Song in KBS drama At a Distance, Spring Is Green. Cha starred in office drama On the Verge of Insanity alongside Jung Jae-young and Moon So-ri in which Cha played former head of the finance team at the head office, Shin Jong-ah. She rejoin the Changin Business Department's finance team as a contract manager. 

In August 2021, Cha starred in healing drama Hometown Cha-Cha-Cha alongside Shin Min-a and Kim Seon-ho in which Cha played owner of Chinese Restaurant, Cho Nam-seok, village gossip lady with hidden sadness. Cha's chemistry with Shin Min-a and Lee Bong-ryun was praised. Cha also joined the crew of rebooted show Saturday Night Live Korea along with Red Velvet's Wendy. In September, she was cast in web series Dr. Park's Clinic as Choi Mi-yeong, which premiered on TVING in January 2022.

On January 19, 2022 Cha signed an exclusive contract with YNK Entertainment. In April, she joined the SBS legal drama Why Her as professor of family medicine. In June Cha made special appearance in drama Cleaning Up as sister in law of Su-ja (played by Kim Jae-hwa). 

In 2023, Cha joined MBC drama Kokdu: Season of Deity.

Filmography

Films

Television series

Television shows

Stage

Musical

Theater

Awards and nominations

References

External links

 
 
  
 Cha Chung-hwa on Daum Encyclopedia 
 Cha Chung-hwa on Daum Movie 
 Cha Chung-hwa on Naver 
 Cha Chung-hwa on PlayDB 

Living people
People from Suwon
1980 births
Sangmyung University alumni
South Korean film actresses
South Korean musical theatre actresses
South Korean stage actresses
South Korean television actresses
21st-century South Korean actresses